Joliette-Montcalm was a former provincial electoral district in the Lanaudière region of  Quebec, Canada that elected members to the National Assembly of Quebec.

It was created for the 1973 election, from parts of the existing Joliette and Montcalm electoral districts.  Its final election was in 1976.  It disappeared in the 1981 election and its successor electoral district was the re-created Joliette.

Members of the National Assembly

Electoral results

|-
 
|Liberal
|Robert Quenneville
|align="right"|10,496
|align="right"|28.16
|align="right"|-27.45
|-

|-

|-

|Workers
|Jacques Trudeau
|align="right"|97
|align="right"|0.26
|align="right"|-
|-

|No designation
|Isabelle Geoffroy
|align="right"|89
|align="right"|0.24
|align="right"|-
|}

|-
 
|Liberal
|Robert Quenneville
|align="right"|18,010
|align="right"|55.61
|align="right"|+15.29

|-

|Parti créditiste
|André Bourbonnière
|align="right"|1,712
|align="right"|5.28
|align="right"|+1.20
|-

|}

External links
Election results
 Election results (National Assembly)
 Election results (Quebecpolitique.com)

Former provincial electoral districts of Quebec